3-Octanone is an organic compound with the formula .  A colorless, fragrant liquid, it is classified as a  ketone.  It is one of three octanones, the others being 2-octanone and 4-octanone.

Occurrence
3-Octanone is found in a variety of sources such as plants (such as lavender), herbs  (such as rosemary), basil and thyme, and nectarines.

It is used as a flavor and fragrance ingredient.

It was also found to be present in Japanese catnip (Schizonepeta tenuifolia), and the pine king bolete (Boletus pinophilus).

It is produced by the oyster mushroom as an insecticide.

See also
 Filbertone

References

Octanones
Perfume ingredients